This is a list of notable members of the Nair community of southern India.

Dynasties

 Zamorin of Calicut
Kingdom of Travancore
Thekkumkur Kingdom
Vadakkumkur Kingdom
 Chirakkal Raja
 Kadathanadu
 Kingdom of Venad 
 Valluvanad
 Ernād
 Palakkad
 Kingdom of Kolathunadu
Kavalappara Moopil Nayar

Spiritual leaders
 Tapovan Maharaj
 Chattampi Swamikal – Hindu sage, social reformer
 Devasahayam Pillai – Roman Catholic Saint canonized by the Church
 Swami Chinmayananda – Spiritual leader and founding father of Vishwa Hindu Parishad

Politicians
 Devan Nair, 3rd President of Singapore.
A K Gopalan, Prominent Communist leader and First Opposition Leader of Loksabha.
 V.K. Krishna Menon, Veteran Indian Diplomat, known for his 8-hour speech in UN Security Council on Kashmir issue. Known as 'Hero of Kashmir'. Architect of Non-Aligned Movement.
 Shashi Tharoor, Member of Parliament. Former Under-Secretary-General of the United Nations (2001–2007).
 M. G. Ramachandran, Former Chief Minister of Tamil Nadu.
 Pattom Thanu Pillai, Former Chief Minister of Kerala.
 C. Sankaran Nair, Former president of Indian National Congress).
 A. R. Menon (Ambattu Ravunni Menon), popular politician and doctor, first Minister of Health in Kerala.
 M. V. Raghavan.
 E K Nayanar, Former Chief Minister of Kerala.
 C Achutha Menon, Former Chief Minister of Kerala.
 P K Vasudevan Nair, Former Chief Minister of Kerala.
 R.Balakrishna Pillai, Former Minister of Kerala.
 Ramesh Chennithala, Former Home Minister of Kerala.
Prakash Karat, CPI(M) Politbureau member.

Policymakers/administrators
Velu Thampi Dalawa – Dalawa of erstwhile Travancore Kingdom and freedom fighter.
Raja Kesavadas – Dewan of Travancore. Known as the "maker of modern Alleppey".
Paliath Achan
 K. P. S. Menon (senior)
V. P. Menon – Constitutional Adviser and Political Reforms Commissioner to the last three Viceroys during British rule in India.
V K Krishna Menon
 C. Madhavan Nair
 M. K. Narayanan
 Mannathu Padmanabha Pillai
P. K. Narayana Panicker
K. M. Panikkar – Historian, novelist, and diplomat.
 M. G. Ramachandran
K. Kelappan – a.k.a. Kerala Gandhi, freedom fighter, founder of the Nair Service Society.
Jyotindra Nath Dixit – Former National Security Adviser.
K. Sankaran Nair - Second director of the Research and Analysis Wing

Military personnel

 Lt General Kunhiraman Palat Candeth, Padmabhushan Awardee.
Major Sandeep Unnikrishnan, Ashoka Chakra Awardee.
Captain Harshan R Nair Ashoka Chakra Awardee. 2 Para SF. Youngest ever recipient.
Colonel Neelakantan Jayachandran Nair, Ashoka Chakra Awardee. 
Lt General Sarath Chand, Vice Chief of Army Staff of Indian Army.
Lakshmi Sahgal, Veteran freedom fighter and was Chief of Jhansi Rani Regiment of Indian National Army.
R. Hari Kumar, 25th Chief of the Naval Staff (CNS)

Arts & literature 
 Bharath Gopi
 Suresh Gopi
 C. V. Raman Pillai
 Irayimman Thampi
K.B. Ganesh Kumar
Mohanlal
Shobana Chandrakumar Pillai
Travancore Sisters
Vineeth
M. G. Radhakrishnan
M. G. Sreekumar
K. Omanakutty

See also
 National Democratic Party (Kerala) – Political wing of the Nair Service Society
 List of people from Kerala

References

Lists of Indian people by community